June Culp Zeitner (February 7, 1916 – October 11, 2009) was an American non-fiction writer who authored a dozen books and over 1,000 articles about gemstones. She is the namesake of the June Culp Zeitner Emerald, the largest emerald found and cut in the United States.

Life
Zeitner was born on February 7, 1916, in Michigan as June Culp. She graduated from Northern State University.

Zeitner began her career as an English teacher in Mission, South Dakota, in 1937, and she lived in Rapid City, South Dakota, from 1986 to 2009. Over the course of her career, she authored a dozen books and over 1,000 articles about gemstones. She was also an editor at Lapidary Journal for three decades.

Zeitner married Albert Zeitner. She died on October 11, 2009, in Rapid City, South Dakota, at age 93. She is the namesake of the June Culp Zeitner Emerald, the largest emerald found and cut in the United States.

References

1916 births
2009 deaths
People from Rapid City, South Dakota
Northern State University alumni
Writers from South Dakota
20th-century American non-fiction writers